Perry Island may refer to

 Perry Island (Alaska)
 Perry Island (Maryland)
 Perry Island (Queensland)
 Île Perry, in the Rivière des Prairies north of Montreal
 Sarushima

See also
 Parry Island